Hoplolatilus marcosi, the redback sand tilefish, is a species of marine ray-finned fish, a tilefish belonging to the family Malacanthidae. It is native to the western central Pacific Ocean.

Description
Hoplolatilus marcosi has an elongated fusiform body with a slightly forked caudal fin.it is distinctive within the genus by having a horizontal red stripe running either side of the lateral line, although this looks black from a distance. The dorsal fin contains 9 spines and 16 soft rays while the anal fin has 1-2 spines and 14-15 soft rays. This species attains a maximum total length of  although .

Distribution
Hoplolatilus marcosi is found in the western Pacific Ocean and has been recorded from the Indonesia, Philippines, Palau, Papua New Guinea and the Solomon Islands.

Habitat and biology
This species created large mounds of rubble. It feeds on zooplankton. The redback sand tilefish is monogamous and forms pairs to spawn. They can live in aggregations and each pair may steal rubble from the mounds of their neighbours.

Systematics
Hoplolatilus marcosi was first formally described in 1978 by Warren E. Burgess with the type locality given as Tingloy Island off Orensi near Mabini, Batangas, Luzon Island, Philippines.

Etymology
The specific name honours Ferdinand Marcos (1917-1989) who was president of the Philippines at the time this species was discovered.<ref name = ETYFish>{{cite web | url = https://etyfish.org/eupercaria/ | title =Series EUPERCARIA (Incertae sedis): Families CALLANTHIIDAE, CENTROGENYIDAE, DINOLESTIDAE, DINOPERCIDAE, EMMELICHTHYIDAE, MALACANTHIDAE, MONODACTYLIDAE, MORONIDAE, PARASCORPIDIDAE, SCIAENIDAE and SILLAGINIDAE | work = The ETYFish Project Fish Name Etymology Database | accessdate = 15 March 2021 | date = 18 September 2020 | author1 = Christopher Scharpf | author2 = Kenneth J. Lazara | name-list-style = amp | publisher = Christopher Scharpf and Kenneth J. Lazara}}</ref>

UtilisationHoplolatilus marcosi'' occasionally appears in the aquarium trade.

References

marcosi
Taxa named by George H. Burgess
Fish described in 1978